Mogadishu Cathedral is a ruined Roman Catholic cathedral located in Mogadishu, Somalia. Between 1928 and 1991, it served as the seat of the Roman Catholic Diocese of Mogadiscio. Built in 1928 by Italian colonial authorities, much of the building was destroyed in 2008 by al-Shabaab. In 2013, the diocese announced plans to refurbish the building.

History

Mogadishu Cathedral was built in 1928 by the Italian authorities in the former Italian Somaliland. Known as the Cattedrale di Mogadiscio, it was constructed in a Norman Gothic style, based on the Cathedral of Cefalù, in Sicily. It was built in nearly six years by the Italian authorities in their former Italian Somaliland, in a central area of the capital not far from the Governor's Palace.

Indeed, the cathedral was built as the biggest in eastern Africa by order of Cesare Maria De Vecchi, governor of Italian Somaliland who promoted the Christianization of Somali people. It was built between 1923 and 1928 and was used as a model the "Cathedral of Cefalu" (in northern Sicily), created to commemorate the Christian reconquest of Sicily from the Arabs in the 10th century.

The cathedral was done in Norman Gothic style, designed by architect Antonio Vandone. The facade was delimited to the sides by two towers, each 37.50 meters high. The plan of the building was a Latin cross; inside was divided into three naves separated by piers with pointed arches. The church was entrusted to the Consolata missionaries, then replaced by the Franciscans (Friars Minor).

In 1989, on the eve of the outbreak of the civil war in Somalia, the last Bishop of Mogadishu, Salvatore Colombo, was killed by armed insurgents while celebrating Mass in the cathedral. The assassination of Bishop Colombo remains unsolved, despite calls from Somali officials for the case's investigation.

Current situation 

After 1991, the cathedral was no longer regularly used. In late 2008, much of the Catholic cathedral was destroyed.

A BBC correspondent later visited the site in 2012 and reported that some internally displaced people had formed tent settlements on the cathedral grounds. This was in stark contrast to the many new shops that had opened outside, where merchants, optimistic about the city's relative stability since the ousting of the insurgents, had begun to publicly advertise their wares again. The correspondent also mentioned that although the cathedral had structurally incurred considerable damage by having its roof blown off among other things, its walls were still erect, its elegant stone arches still in place, and the general atmosphere was one of serenity.

In April 2013, after a visit to the site to inspect its condition, the diocese announced plans to rebuild the cathedral in the near future.

See also

Roman Catholicism in Somalia
Christianity in Somalia

References

Bibliography
 Guida d'Italia del Touring Club Italiano. - Possedimenti e Colonie, Milano 1929, p. 757.
 D. Paladini. Omicidio a Mogadiscio - L'ultimo vescovo al crepuscolo della Somalia Paoline Editoriale Libri. Roma,2006

External links
 Photos of the Cathedral's interior
  Video of 2014 Cathedral's ruins

Buildings and structures in Mogadishu
Roman Catholic churches completed in 1928
Catholic Church in Somalia
1928 establishments in Italian Somaliland
Roman Catholic cathedrals in Somalia
20th-century Roman Catholic church buildings
Churches destroyed by Muslims